The decade of the 1360s in art involved some significant events.

Events

Paintings

 1365: Theodoric of Prague – St. Jerome and St. Gregory
 1367: Niccolò Semitecolo – Two Christians before the Judges
 c. 1368 – Koran frontispiece (right half of two-page spread), from Cairo, Egypt, is made. It was donated 1369 by Sultan Al-Ashraf Sha'ban to the madrasa established by his mother. It is now kept at National Library, Cairo.

Births
 1369: Xie Jin – Chinese painter and calligrapher (died 1415)
 1366 or 1369: Bartolomeo di Fruosino –  Italian painter and illuminator of the Florentine School (died 1441)
 1366: Hubert van Eyck – Flemish painter and older brother of Jan van Eyck (died 1426)
 1365: Jean Malouel – Netherlandish artist, court painter of Philip the Bold (died 1415)
 1362: Taddeo di Bartolo – Italian painter of the Sienese School during the early Renaissance (died 1422)
 1362: Wang Fu – Chinese landscape painter, calligrapher, and poet during the Ming Dynasty (died 1416)
 1360/1370: Andrei Rublev – the greatest medieval Russian iconographer (painter of Orthodox icons and frescoes) (died 1430)
 1360/1370: Andrea di Bartolo – Italian painter of the Sienese School (died 1428)
 1360/1370: Madern Gerthener – German late Gothic stonemason, sculptor, and architect (died 1430)
 1360: Daniel Chorny – Russian iconographer (died 1430)
 1360: Filippo Scannabecchi – Italian painter of primarily religious themed works (died 1410)

Deaths
 1369: Francesco Talenti – Italian sculptor and architect (born 1300)
 1369: Giottino – Italian painter from Florence (born 1324)
 1368: Matteo Giovanetti – Italian religious-themed fresco painter (born 1322)
 1368: Orcagna – Italian painter, sculptor, and architect active in Florence (born 1308)
 1368: Tang Di – Chinese landscape painter during the Yuan Dynasty (born 1287)
 1366: Taddeo Gaddi – Italian painter and architect, active during the early Renaissance (born 1290)
 1365: Giovanni da Santo Stefano da Ponte – Italian painter of portraits and devotional subjects (born 1306)
 1365: Gu An – Chinese painter in Yuan Dynasty (born 1289)
 1365: Zhu Derun – Chinese painter and poet in Yuan Dynasty (born 1294)
 1362: Giovanni Baronzio – Italian religious painter (born unknown)
 1361: Vitale da Bologna – Italian painter, of the Early Renaissance (born 1330)
 c. 1360: Zhao Yong – Chinese painter in Yuan Dynasty (born 1289)

 
Years of the 14th century in art
Art